This article shows the rosters of all participating teams at the 2016 Asian Junior Women's Volleyball Championship in Nakhon Ratchasima, Thailand.

Pool A

Thailand
The following is the Thai roster in the 2016 Asian Junior Championship.

Head Coach: Chamnan Dokmai

Sri Lanka
The following is the Sri Lankan roster in the 2016 Asian Junior Championship.

Head Coach: Janaka Indrajith

Vietnam
The following is the Vietnamese roster in the 2016 Asian Junior Championship.

Head Coach: Shuto Koichi

Pool B

China
The following is the Chinese roster in the 2016 Asian Junior Championship.

Head Coach: Shen Mang

Kazakhstan
The following is the Kazakhstani roster in the 2016 Asian Junior Championship.

Head Coach: Yelena Pavlova

Hong Kong
The following is the Hong Kong roster in the 2016 Asian Junior Championship.

Head Coach: Cheung King Fai

New Zealand
The following is the New Zealand roster in the 2016 Asian Junior Championship.

Head Coach: Mcilroy Colleen

Pool C

Japan
The following is the Japanese roster in the 2016 Asian Junior Championship.

Head Coach: Abo Kiyoshi

India
The following is the Indian roster in the 2016 Asian Junior Championship.

Head Coach: Jangra Ajay

Macau
The following is the Macau roster in the 2016 Asian Junior Championship.

Head Coach: Leung Ka Ka

Iran
The following is the Iranian roster in the 2016 Asian Junior Championship.

Head Coach: Fariba Sadeghi

Pool D

South Korea
The following is the Korean roster in the 2016 Asian Junior Championship.

Head coach: Park Giju

Chinese Taipei
The following is the Taiwanese roster in the 2016 Asian Junior Championship.

Head Coach: Lo Chung Jen

Australia
The following is the Australian roster in the 2016 Asian Junior Championship.

Head Coach: Pham Nam Viet

Philippines
The following is the Filipino roster in the 2016 Asian Junior Championship.

Head Coach: Francis John Vicente

References

External links
Official website

Asian Junior Women's Volleyball Championship squads